This is a list of eponyms of Nvidia GPU microarchitectures. The eponym in this case is the person after whom an architecture is named. Listed are the person, their portrait, their profession or areas of expertise, their birth year, their death year, their country of origin, the microarchitecture named after them, and the year of release of the GPU architecture.

References

Graphics microarchitectures
Lists of eponyms
Nvidia graphics processors
Nvidia microarchitectures